Sveti Petar Čvrstec  is a village in Croatia. 

Populated places in Koprivnica-Križevci County